Louis Robilliard (born 10 December 1939 in Beirut) is a French classical organist. He won the first prize for organ and improvisation unanimously awarded by the Conservatoire de Paris (1967).

Discography 
Max Reger: Introduction et Passacaille en ré mineur - Charles Widor: Toccata de la Ve Symphonie; History of the Organ, vol. 4, The Modern Age, DVD, ArtHaus Musik 102 153 (1991/1997)

External links 
 Louis Robilliard
 Louis Robilliard on France Musique
 Louis Robillard at Notre Dame de Paris
 Gabriel Fauré - Pelleas et Melisande, op. 80 - I. Prelude, transcribed by Louis Robilliard on YouTube
 Complete discography: France Orgue

.

1939 births
Living people
Musicians from Beirut
Conservatoire de Paris alumni
French classical organists
French male organists
20th-century organists
21st-century organists
20th-century French male musicians
21st-century French male musicians
Male classical organists